Juan Manuel Murré (born 21 March 1980) is a former rugby union player. He played as a prop. Born in Argentina, he is a naturalised citizen of Portugal and has played for that national team.

Career
Murré first played in Portugal at Belenenses, later becoming a naturalized Portuguese citizen. He was soon selected for the Portugal squad which played at the 2007 Rugby World Cup finals. He won his first cap at the 10-56 defeat to Scotland, and also played in the matches against Italy and Romania. He was assigned to the Italian team of Pozzi Livorno soon after.

He was a regular player with the Portugal squad, from 2006 to 2013, counting 37 caps with 2 tries scored, 10 points in aggregate.

Notes

External links

1980 births
Living people
Argentine rugby union players
Portuguese rugby union players
Portugal international rugby union players
Argentine emigrants to Portugal
Naturalised citizens of Portugal
Portuguese people of Argentine descent
Sportspeople of Argentine descent
Rugby union props